Andrea Londo is an American actress. She is known for portraying Maria Salazar in Narcos Season 3.

Career 
Londo was born in San Diego and was going to school there, but her home was in Tijuana - she commuted across border.

Londo has no formal training as an actress. She began her career doing short films. In 2015 she made her professional acting debut in Catfish: The TV Show, her first TV credit. It was in 2016 that she appeared in her first TV guest star appearance on Faking it, and her first co-star on Criminal Minds Beyond Borders, and then her first recurring role on Narcos as Maria Salazar.

In 2017, it was announced that Londo would be playing Carnalita in Kurt Sutter's Sons of Anarchy spinoff Mayans M.C., though the role was later recast. Londo was still filming Narcos and her schedules ended up conflicting. Of the experience she said: "I had to get recast 3 days before I was scheduled to shoot the pilot. It's been one of the hardest lessons of my acting career thus far, but only motivated me that much more."

Londo was number 87 on FHM's 2017 list of 100 sexiest women in the world. In 2018, Londo played Cynthia in Sony's action thriller Superfly, directed by Director X. In 2020, Londo starred alongside Jackson Rathbone and Wendy Robie in Dreaming Grand Avenue.

Filmography

References

External links 
 

Living people
1992 births
American actresses of Mexican descent
American film actresses
American television actresses
21st-century American actresses